Parafossarulus anomalospiralis  is a species of freshwater snail with gills and an operculum, an aquatic prosobranch gastropod mollusk in the family Bithyniidae.

Distribution 
This species occurs in Jilin Province, China.

Description
The shell has four whorls. The suture is deep. The width of the shell is 9.0-9.5 mm. The height of the shell is 15.0-18.0 mm.

Reproductive system and radula was described by Liu et al. (1985).

Parasites 
Parafossarulus anomalospiralis is the first intermediate host for:
 trematode Clonorchis sinensis

References 

Bithyniidae
Gastropods described in 1985